Jeppe Mehl (born 21 September 1986) is a Danish footballer who plays as a midfielder for Danish 2nd Division club Holstebro Boldklub.

Career
On 20 April 2018, it was confirmed that Mehl would return to Thisted FC for the 2018–19 season after playing multiple years in the higher Danish divisions for Esbjerg fB and AC Horsens . Mehl was promoted to playing assistant manager at the end of June 2019 for the upcoming season.

In June 2020, Mehl moved to fourth-tier Denmark Series club Holstebro Boldklub, who he helped to promotion to the third tier in his first months at the club after play-offs against Silkeborg KFUM.

References

External links
 
 Career statistics at Danmarks Radio

1986 births
Living people
Danish men's footballers
Thisted FC players
Esbjerg fB players
AC Horsens players
Danish Superliga players
Association football midfielders
People from Thisted
Danish 1st Division players
Danish 2nd Division players
Holstebro BK players
Sportspeople from the North Jutland Region